The following lists events that happened during 1949 in Australia.

Incumbents

 Monarch – George VI
 Governor-General – William McKell
 Prime Minister – Ben Chifley (until 19 December), then Robert Menzies
 Chief Justice – Sir John Latham

State Governors
 Governor of New South Wales – Sir John Northcott
 Governor of Queensland – Sir John Lavarack
 Governor of South Australia – Sir Charles Norrie
 Governor of Tasmania – Sir Hugh Binney
 Governor of Victoria – Sir Winston Dugan (until 20 February), then Sir Dallas Brooks (from 18 October)
 Governor of Western Australia – Sir James Mitchell

Events
26 January – The Nationality and Citizenship Act is passed. Rather than being identified as subjects of Britain, the Act established Australian citizenship for people who met eligibility requirements.
2 March - A cyclone crosses the Central Queensland coast impacting Gladstone and Rockhampton.
10 March – A Lockheed Model 18 Lodestar crashes near Coolangatta, Queensland, killing all 21 on board.
16 March – Australia's domestic counter-intelligence and security agency, the Australian Security Intelligence Organisation (ASIO) is established, by order of the Directive for the Establishment and Maintenance of a Security Service.
16 March – Indigenous Australians who are eligible to vote in state elections in New South Wales, Victoria, South Australia and Tasmania are also given the right to vote in federal elections.
27 June – A seven-week coal strike begins, involving 23,000 miners and broken by the sending in of troops.
2 July - A MacRobertson Miller Aviation DC-3 aircraft crashes on take-off from Perth Airport, killing all 18 on board.
17 October – Construction of the Snowy Mountains Hydro-Electric Scheme begins.
10 December – A federal election is held. The incumbent Australian Labor Party led by Ben Chifley is defeated by Robert Menzies' Liberal Party.
18 December – Prime Minister-elect Robert Menzies announces his cabinet, including Dame Enid Lyons as Australia's first female cabinet minister.

Science and technology
 November – Australia's first digital computer, CSIRAC, runs its first test programs.

Arts and literature

 21 January – William Dobell wins the Archibald Prize and the Wynne Prize.

Sport
 Athletics
 17 September - Robert Prentice wins his first men's national marathon title, clocking 2:43:46 in Perth
 Cricket
 New South Wales wins the Sheffield Shield
 Football
 Bledisloe Cup: won by the Wallabies
 Brisbane Rugby League premiership: Souths defeated Easts 22-8
 New South Wales Rugby League premiership: Western Suburbs defeated Balmain 8-5
 South Australian National Football League premiership: won by North Adelaide
 Victorian Football League premiership: Essendon defeated Carlton 125-52
 Golf
 Australian Open: won by Eric Cremin
 Australian PGA Championship: won by Kel Nagle
 Horse Racing
 Persist wins the AJC Oaks
 Lincoln wins the Caulfield Cup
 Delta wins the Cox Plate
 Foxzami wins the Melbourne Cup
 Motor Racing
 The Australian Grand Prix was held at Leyburn, and was won by John Crouch driving a Delahaye
 Tennis
 Australian Open men's singles: Frank Sedgman defeats John Bromwich 6-3 6-2 6-2
 Australian Open women's singles: Doris Hart defeats Nancye Wynne Bolton 6-3 6-4
 Davis Cup: Australia is defeated by the United States 1–4 in the 1949 Davis Cup final
 US Open: John Bromwich and Bill Sidwell win the Men's Doubles
 Yachting
 Waltzing Matilda takes line honours and Trade Winds wins on handicap in the Sydney to Hobart Yacht Race

Births
 11 January – Daryl Braithwaite, singer
 14 January – Paul Chubb (died 2002), actor
 26 February – Simon Crean, trade union leader and politician
 7 March – Rex Hunt, media personality
 13 June – Red Symons, musician and TV personality
 30 June – John Kobelke (died 2019), Western Australian politician
 1 July – John Farnham, singer and entertainer
 16 July – Robert Proctor, field hockey player
 18 July – Dennis Lillee, cricketer
 28 July – Peter Doyle, singer and guitarist (died 2001)
 18 August – Byron Kennedy (died 1983), film producer
 23 August – Rick Springfield, singer
 22 September – Jim McGinty, politician
 14 October – Fraser Anning, politician
 6 November – Malcolm Poole, field hockey player 
 12 November – Deb Foskey (died 2020), Australian Capital Territory politician
 24 November – Shane Bourne, comedian and actor
 5 December – Wendy Craik, scientist, public policy adviser and company director

Deaths

 8 January – Mary Miller, singer (b. 1926)
 3 February – Kate Dwyer, educator, suffragist and labour activist (b. 1861)
 7 April – Richard Crouch, Victorian politician (b. 1868)
 26 April – Norman Brookman, South Australian politician (b. 1884)
 14 August – Henry Ernest Boote, editor, journalist, and poet (born in the United Kingdom) (b. 1865)
 15 August – Vida Goldstein, suffragette and social reformer (b. 1869)
 16 August – John Lemmone, flautist, composer and manager (b. 1861)
 27 August – Theodora Cowan, sculptor (b. 1868)
 2 September – Jack Beasley, New South Wales politician (b. 1895)
 9 September – Sir John Kirwan, Western Australian politician (born in the United Kingdom) (b. 1869)
 16 November – Margaret Battye, barrister and jurist (b. 1909)
 21 November – Philip Lytton, actor and theatre entrepreneur (b. unknown)
 18 December – Florence Anderson, trade union secretary (b. 1871)
 Unknown – Eric Muspratt, travel writer (b. 1899)
 Unknown – Alfred Wheeler, minister and composer (b. 1865)

See also
 List of Australian films of the 1940s

References

 
Australia
Years of the 20th century in Australia